The Mount Skukum Volcanic Complex is an early Eocene caldera complex, located 43 km west of Carcross and 32 km northeast of Mount Porsild in the Yukon Territory, Canada.  The complex composes the Skukum Group. It is a northeast-trending complex of subaerial volcanic and volcaniclastic rocks covering 140 km2.

The Mount Skukum Volcanic Complex was formed when the ancient Kula Plate was subducting under North America during the early Eocene period.

See also
Volcanism of Northern Canada
Bennett Lake Volcanic Complex
List of volcanoes of Canada

External links
 Mount Skukum in the Canadian Mountain encyclopedia.

Subduction volcanoes
Calderas of Yukon
Complex volcanoes
Eocene calderas